Pharmaceutical Product Development (PPD) is a global contract research organization (CRO) providing comprehensive, integrated drug development, laboratory and lifecycle management services. In December 2021, PPD became a  wholly owned subsidiary of Thermo Fisher Scientific.

History
PPD was founded by Fred Eshelman, Pharm.D., as a one-person consulting firm in 1985. The following year he expanded the company's scope to include development services and relocated operations from Maryland to North Carolina.
 July 1985: Fred Eshelman, Pharm.D., founds PPD as a one-person consulting firm based in his home in Maryland.
 1986: Eshelman expands the company and relocates operations to Wilmington, North Carolina.
 January 1989: The company incorporates in North Carolina.
 January 1996: PPD issues its initial public stock offering and begins trading on the Nasdaq National Market System under the symbol PPDI.
 October 2005: PPD's board of directors adopts an annual cash dividend policy.
 July 2009: The company promotes Eshelman to executive chairman and names David Grange chief executive officer.
 January 2010: The company commemorates the 25th anniversary of its founding.
 June 2010: PPD spins off its compound partnering division as a new and independent publicly traded company, Furiex Pharmaceuticals.
 May 2011: David Grange retires as chief executive officer of PPD.
 September 2011: PPD's board of directors names Raymond Hill as PPD's new chief executive officer.
 December 2011: The company is acquired by affiliates of The Carlyle Group and affiliates of Hellman & Friedman in an all-cash transaction valued at approximately $3.9 billion.
 May 2012: PPD's board of directors names David Simmons as chairman and CEO.
 August 2013: PPD acquires Acurian.
 December 2014: PPD announces an agreement with SNBL to form a joint venture to provide full range of clinical development services in Japan.
 May 2015: PPD expands network of U.S.-based research sites via strategic relationship with Radiant.
 June 2016: PPD expands network of global research sites via strategic relationship with Synexus.
 September 2016: PPD acquires Evidera.
 April 2017: Hellman & Friedman and affiliates of The Carlyle Group enter into definitive agreements to recapitalize PPD and expand the company's ownership to include two new investors, a subsidiary of the Abu Dhabi Investment Authority and an affiliate of GIC Private Limited, Singapore's sovereign wealth fund.
 July 2018: PPD launches new site solution.
 July 2018: Synexus announces U.S.-based registry to power major longitudinal study on brain aging.
 February 2019: PPD inks deal with China's HLT to create data science-driven research solutions.
 May 2019: PPD's Evidera acquires RWE provider Medimix.
 September 2019: PPD's Accelerated Enrollment Solutions acquires global site business from Bioclinica.
 February 2020: PPD issues its initial public stock offering and begins trading on the Nasdaq Global Select Market under the symbol PPD.
 April 2021: Thermo Fisher Scientific announces plans to acquire PPD.
 December 2021: Thermo Fisher Scientific completes the acquisition of PPD.

Location
PPD had its headquarters in Wilmington, North Carolina.  The company has more than 27,000 employees. As of December 2021, PPD became a wholly owned subsidiary of Thermo Fisher Scientific based in Waltham, Massachusetts.

References

External links

Companies formerly listed on the Nasdaq
Pharmaceutical companies of the United States
Contract research organizations
Companies based in Wilmington, North Carolina
Health care companies based in North Carolina
American companies established in 1985
Pharmaceutical companies established in 1985
1985 establishments in Maryland
1996 initial public offerings
2011 mergers and acquisitions
2020 initial public offerings
2021 mergers and acquisitions
American corporate subsidiaries